North Karelia is a region in eastern Finland. It borders the regions of Kainuu, North Savo, South Savo and South Karelia, as well as Russia's Republic of Karelia. It is the easternmost region of Finland and shares a  border with Russia. The city of Joensuu is the capital and the largest settlement of the region.

North Karelia has successfully reduced chronic diseases through public health measures. In the 1960s Finland led industrialized nations in heart disease mortality rates; North Karelia had Finland's highest incidence. In 1972 a long-term project was undertaken which targeted this risk in North Karelia. The resulting improvement in public health is still considered remarkable, a model for the rest of the nation. North Karelia is also known as the most sociable region in Finland.

Historical province

Municipalities 

The region of North Karelia is made up of 13 municipalities, of which five have city status (marked in bold).

Joensuu sub-region:
 Heinävesi
Population: 
 Ilomantsi (Ilomants)
Population: 
 Joensuu
Population: 
 Juuka (Juga)
Population: 
 Kontiolahti (Kontiolax)
Population: 
 Liperi (Libelits)
Population: 
 Outokumpu
Population: 
 Polvijärvi
Population: 

Central Karelia sub-region:
 Kitee (Kides)
Population: 
 Rääkkylä
Population: 
 Tohmajärvi
Population: 
Pielinen Karelia sub-region:
 Lieksa
Population: 
 Nurmes
Population:

Heraldry 

The coat of arms of North Karelia is composed of the arms of Karelia.

Education
Institutions of higher education in North Karelia include:
University of Eastern Finland
North Karelia University of Applied Sciences
Riveria Vocational Education and Training

Politics
Results of the 2019 Finnish parliamentary election in North Karelia:

Centre Party  24.46%
Social Democratic Party  21.41%
Finns Party  18.83%
Green League  9.93%
National Coalition Party  9.01%
Christian Democrats  6.68%
Left Alliance  5.26%
Blue Reform   2.24%
Movement Now   0.96%
Seven Star Movement   0.21%
Other parties   1.01%

In popular culture
The song "Pohjois-Karjala" ("North Karelia") by the Finnish pop rock band Leevi and the Leavings tells the story of an urban man who dreams of returning to his native region of North Karelia. It has become such a big hit in North Karelia that it is almost perceived as a regional song.

References

External links 

North Karelia
 Visitkarelia.fi - Information about travel, tourism and other fields in North Karelia
 Video about travelling in North Karelia
 Pielis.ru – travel information about North Karelia region and City of Joensuu

 
Eastern Finland Province
Karelia North